Andrea Berger (born January 28, 1970) is an American former professional tennis player. At the 1989 Maccabiah Games in Tel Aviv, she won a gold medal in the women's doubles event, and was runner-up to Ilana Berger (no relation) in the singles, earning a silver medal.

Biography
Berger grew up in Florida, attending American Heritage School, and lived in Plantation, Florida. A younger sister of tennis player Jay Berger, she was a US Open junior quarter-finalist and represented the United States in the World Youth Cup.

On the professional tour, Berger made two main draw appearances at the Lipton Championships, including in 1987 when she beat Grace Kim to make the second round. She reached a best singles ranking of 227 in the world.

Berger, who is Jewish, won a gold medal and a silver medal for the United States at the 1989 Maccabiah Games in Tel Aviv. She won the women's doubles event with Jill Waldman, and was runner-up to Ilana Berger (no relation) in the singles.

In 1988-89 she became as a freshman she became the first Lady Gator to win 20 matches in a season. Between 1989 and 1991 she played collegiate tennis for the University of Florida. Now, Berger plays mixed doubles with her husband in the USTA league where they have been reigning champions for the past ten years together.

References

External links
 
 

1970 births
Living people
American female tennis players
Florida Gators women's tennis players
Competitors at the 1989 Maccabiah Games
Maccabiah Games gold medalists for the United States
Maccabiah Games silver medalists for the United States
Maccabiah Games medalists in tennis
Jewish American sportspeople
Jewish tennis players
People from Plantation, Florida
Sportspeople from the Miami metropolitan area